= Qaraibad =

- Location within Azerbaijan
- Coordinates: 40°23′45″N 49°33′21″E
- Country: Azerbaijan
- City: Baku
- Time zone: UTC+4 (AZT)
  - Summer (DST): UTC+5 (AZT)

Qaraibad (also, Karaibat) is a village in Baku, Azerbaijan.
